Alan Ross (1922–2001) was a British poet and editor.

Alan Ross may also refer to:
 Alan S. C. Ross (1907–1980), British linguist
 Alan Ross (footballer, born 1933), English footballer
 Allan Ross (1942–1999), Scottish football goalkeeper (Carlisle United)
 Alan Ross, American singer-songwriter with Children of Rain
 Allan Ronald Ross (1944-2018), Canadian gangster.